Sergei Kosmynin (born 26 May 1964) is a Russian judoka. He competed in the men's half-lightweight event at the 1992 Summer Olympics, representing the Unified Team.

Achievements

References

External links
 

1964 births
Living people
Russian male judoka
Olympic judoka of the Unified Team
Judoka at the 1992 Summer Olympics
People from Mezhdurechensk, Kemerovo Oblast
Sportspeople from Kemerovo Oblast